Jorge Sebastián Matías Lagües Suárez (born 22 January 1997) is a Chilean professional footballer who plays as a defensive midfielder for Chilean Segunda División club Rodelindo Román.

Club career
A product of Colo-Colo's youth system, Lagües made his Primera División de Chile debut on 4 January 2015 in a 1–0 home defeat against San Marcos de Arica for the Torneo Clausura. He was sent to the field on 81st minute replacing Jaime Valdés. Likewise, he was member of Colo-Colo squad which won the 2016 Copa Chile.

In July 2017, he was loaned to Deportes Valdivia. He made his team debut on 9 July in a 2017 Copa Chile match against Huachipato. He scored his side's goal in a 1–2 home loss. During the Primera B de Chile season, he made 13 appearances and scored two goals: a) the only one goal in the sixth week's 1–0 home victory over Unión San Felipe; b) his side's goal in the 2–1 away loss with San Marcos de Arica.

In 2020, he joined Rodelindo Román.

Honours

Club
Colo-Colo
 Copa Chile: 2016

References

External links
 
 Jorge Lagües at playmakerstats.com (English version of ceroacero.es)

1997 births
Living people
People from Vallenar
People from Huasco Province
People from Atacama Region
Association football midfielders
Chilean footballers
Colo-Colo footballers
Deportes Vallenar footballers
Deportes Valdivia footballers
C.D. Arturo Fernández Vial footballers
San Antonio Unido footballers
Rodelindo Román footballers
Chilean Primera División players
Segunda División Profesional de Chile players
Primera B de Chile players